In the mathematical field of graph theory, the term "null graph" may refer either to the order-zero graph, or alternatively, to any edgeless graph (the latter is sometimes called an "empty graph").

Order-zero graph

The order-zero graph, is the unique graph having no vertices (hence its order is zero). It follows that  also has no edges. Thus the null graph is a regular graph of degree zero. Some authors exclude  from consideration as a graph (either by definition, or more simply as a matter of convenience). Whether including  as a valid graph is useful depends on context. On the negative side, including  as a graph requires that many well-defined formulas for graph properties include exceptions for it (for example, either "counting all strongly connected components of a graph" becomes "counting all non-null strongly connected components of a graph", or the definition of connected graphs has to be modified not to include ). To avoid the need for such exceptions, it is often assumed in literature that the term graph implies "graph with at least one vertex" unless context suggests otherwise.

In category theory, the order-zero graph is, according to some definitions of "category of graphs," the initial object in the category. 

 does fulfill (vacuously) most of the same basic graph properties as does  (the graph with one vertex and no edges). As some examples,  is of size zero, it is equal to its complement graph , a forest, and a planar graph. It may be considered undirected, directed, or even both; when considered as directed, it is a directed acyclic graph. And it is both a complete graph and an edgeless graph.

Edgeless graph

For each natural number , the edgeless graph (or empty graph)  of order  is the graph with  vertices and zero edges.  An edgeless graph is occasionally referred to as a null graph in contexts where the order-zero graph is not permitted.

It is a 0-regular graph. The notation  arises from the fact that the -vertex edgeless graph is the complement of the complete graph .

See also

 Glossary of graph theory
 Cycle graph
 Path graph

Notes

References

 Harary, F. and Read, R. (1973), "Is the null graph a pointless concept?", Graphs and Combinatorics (Conference, George Washington University), Springer-Verlag, New York, NY.

Graph families
Regular graphs